Jan or Joannes Cnobbaert (1590–1637) was a Flemish printer, publisher and bookseller who was active in Antwerp in the early 17th century.

Life
Cnobbaert was born in Antwerp in 1590. He married Maria de Man. In 1623 he was registered as living next to the 'Huys der Professen vande Societeyt IESV, in S. Peeter' in Antwerp. After he died in Antwerp on 14 September 1637 his widow Maria continued the business as "Widow of Jan Cnobbaert" ('Vidua Cnobbaert' or 'Veuve Cnobbaert'). The printer Michiel Cnobbaert or Knobbaert who was active at the same address in the 1660s and early 1670s was probably a relative (possibly a son).

In 1642 his daughter, Jacoba Maria, married the artist Jan Thomas van Ieperen.

Publications
 1620: Johann Buchler, Thesaurus phrasium poeticarum
 1625: Lodewijk Makeblijde, Den hemelschen handel der devote zielen
 1627: Gesuiti : Collegium Antuerpiense, Typus mundi in quo eius calamitates et pericula nec non diuini, humanique amoris antipathia, emblematice proponuntur
 1629: De groote evangelische peerle vol devote ghebeden, goddelijcke oeffeningen, ende gheestelijcke leeringhen
 1631: Antonius a Burgundia, Linguae vitia et remedia
 
 1632
 Jaerlijcksche brieven van Japonien der jaren 1625. 1626. 1627
 Guilielmus Bolognino, Uyt-vaert van het ghereformeert nachtmael
 Augustinus Wichmans, Brabantia Mariana tripartita
 Bonaventura Speeckaert, Den Spieghel der Patientie onses salighmakers Iesu Christi ghebenediidt
 1634
 François-Hyacinthe Choquet, Mariae Deiparae in ordinem praedicatorum viscera materna
 Erycius Puteanus, Historiae barbaricae libri VI
 1635
 Augustine of Hippo, De boecken der belydenissen
 Diego de Aedo y Gallart, El memorable y glorioso viaje del infante Cardenal D. Fernándo de Avstria
 French translation as Le voyage du prince Don Fernande frère du Roy Philippe IV
 Famiano Strada, De Bello Belgico
 Michiel Zachmoorter, Thalamus sponsi, bruydegom's beddeken: het tweede deel
 1636
 Cornelius Curtius, Virorum illustrium ex ordine eremitarum D. Augustini
 Jeremias Drexel, Caelum beatorum civitas aeternitatis

References

External links
 

1590 births
1637 deaths
Flemish printers
Flemish publishers
Painters from Antwerp
Businesspeople from Antwerp
Bookselling